The Aryan Brigade is a group of supervillains in DC Comics. They were also known as the Purifiers of the Aryan Nation. The first version of the Aryan Brigade first appeared in Justice League Task Force #10 (March 1994) and were created by Michael Jan Friedman.

Fictional character biography

First Aryan Brigade
The DC Universe's version of the Aryan Nation is a white supremacist terrorist organization that created a designer virus which would attack and destroy "non-white" DNA in humans. They were secretly led by U.S. Senator Sanders Hotchkins. When several noted chemists began disappearing, they drew the FBI's attention. The FBI contacted Hannibal Martin, the Justice League Task Force's liaison, and the Martian Manhunter assembled a covert team to infiltrate the terrorists. While undercover, Hourman was forced to use his powers and drew the attention of the Aryan Nation's superhuman enforcers who call themselves the Aryan Brigade. Thanks to Blind Faith's mental powers, the Aryan Brigade was able to uncover and surprise the Task Force. They captured all but Hourman who returned to free them. In the meantime, the Nation had readied its virus for delivery into the atmosphere. J'onn followed the rocket and forced it to detonate in space. All members of the organization were subsequently arrested.

Following this, the Aryan Brigade's members were recruited by the Overmaster to be part of his new Cadre. Golden Eagle II and Heatmonger popped up in one of the incarnations of the Suicide Squad.

In Infinite Crisis, Iron Cross was seen as a member of Alexander Luthor Jr.'s Secret Society of Super Villains where he is among those who took part in the Battle of Metropolis.

One Year Later, Iron Cross was seen amongst the recent incarnation of the Injustice League.

Heatmonger and Iron Cross were among the villains transported to another world in Salvation Run. Iron Cross was killed by the Joker. Heatmonger is used by Lex Luthor as a power source for a teleportation device, and is seemingly killed when it self-destructs.

Blind Faith and Backlash appear as part of a group of villains seeking to avoid being sent to the prison planet.

Second Aryan Brigade
A new version of the Aryan Brigade appears and is composed of Backlash and new members Rebel, Bonehead and Luftwaffe. They attack a casino in Las Vegas, but are swiftly defeated by the Freedom Fighters.

Members

First Aryan Brigade members
The members of the first Aryan Brigade are:

 Backlash - A supervillain who had elastic whip-like arms.
 Blind Faith - A female blind psychic supervillain who serves as the group's seer.
 Golden Eagle - A supervillain equipped with an exo-skeleton and artificial wings. Not to be confused with the first Golden Eagle.
 Heatmonger - A female supervillain with robotic arms that shoot out blasts of thermal energy.
 Iron Cross - A supervillain with super-strength.

Second Aryan Brigade members
The members of the second Aryan Brigade are:

 Backlash - A supervillain who had elastic whip-like arms.
 Bonehead - A bulletproof man with spikes protruding from his skull.
 Luftwaffe - A powerful metahuman in full World War II German pilot attire.
 Rebel - A superstrong white supremacist.

In other media

Television
A male version of Heat Monger named Lucious Coolidge appears in The Flash season three episode "Cause and Effect", portrayed by Richard Zeman. Lucious Coolidge, nicknamed Heat Monger, is a criminal and arsonist in Central City and an enemy of the Flash and Kid Flash. Coolidge became known as Central City's most notorious arsonist ever since Mick Rory "went off the grid". At some point, he was defeated by the Flash and arrested by the Central City Police Department. At Coolidge's trial, he glared at Cisco Ramon and Julian Albert when they made fun of his codename. Cecille Horton was the prosecution in his case. Barry went up to testify, but unknown to Judge Hankerson and Coolidge, Barry had lost all of his memories. As such, he botched the testimony and Judge Hankerson allowed Coolidge to walk. Upon his release, Coolidge was back to his old tricks, setting fire to a large office building. However, he was defeated by Barry (who had recently regained his memories) and Kid Flash and was arrested again.

Film
Iron Cross, Heatmonger and Backlash were reportedly featured in David S. Goyer's script for an upcoming Green Arrow film project entitled Escape from Super Max. In the script, the trio appeared as inmates of the Super Max Penitentiary for Metahumans.

References

External links
 Aryan Brigade at the Unofficial DC Universe Guide
 Aryan Brigade at the DC Wiki

DC Comics supervillain teams
Comics characters introduced in 1994
DC Comics neo-Nazis